St Joseph's Higher Secondary School, Thalassery is an educational institution in Thalassery, Kerala. It was started as an Anglo-Indian school in the 16th century, run under the management of Latin Diocese of Kannur. It is located in the heart of the town of Thalassery beside the Tellicherry Fort. The school gives a view of the Arabian sea even from the classrooms.

History 

In the early 16th century, an Anglo-Indian school was established as part of the Holy Rosary Church. It is one of the oldest schools in the region. It was recognized in 1854 and upgraded from a Middle School to a High School in 1941. In 2000, a further higher secondary section was added.

This English medium school was initially known as European School and Catholic Middle School. In 1922, Italian missionary Father John Baptist Galanta transformed the European school to an Indian middle school.

Until September 1939, Father Galanta was the headmaster and manager. Moorkoth Kumaran, a short story writer of early Malayalam literature, the municipal vice chairman of Thalassery during that period, and an eminent person in the social and political fields, was the first assistant until 30 April 1930. In October 1940 Sri. P. Kanari B.A.L.T was appointed as the headmaster. In this 3rd forum (Up to class 7th) school 166 students were enrolled. The service rented by P. P. Varid master, Vidwan Varghese Thalleketty, Britto teacher, Auseph master for the welfare of this school are ever memorable. 101 prominent citizens presented a memorandum in front of father Rodrigs.

On 1 June 1941, St. Josephs Boys High School opened with 32 students. The school obtained a two-story building, library and laboratory. Father George Pathiyil was appointed as the headmaster of Saint Joseph's High School in 1952. It is regarded as one of the foremost educational institutions in Kerala with focus on holistic education from class 5 to class 12 while producing notable sports talent and public figures.

Rank holders

Higher secondary school  

 Farzana Puthiya Nelliyil 8th Rank 2004

SSLC  

 Prem Venugopal - 11th Rank 1990 
 Vivek P - 10th Rank 1997 
 Subith V.S - 14th Rank 1997 
 Naquash P V - 8th Rank 1998 
 Sreenath S - 13th Rank 1998 
 Vineeth Vijayan - 10th Rank 1999 
 Nithin Valsan - 6th Rank 2001 
 Ramshid Rasheed - 13th Rank 2002 
 Vineeth Kumar K 
 Sarang Vijayan - 15th Rank 2002 
 Jithin Raj - 11th Rank 2003 
 Anand P - 13th Rank 2003 
 Shobith P J - 13th Rank 2003 
 Sayooj Laxman - 7th Rank 2004 
 Niketh K Prabhakar - 12th Rank 2004

See also
 Educational Institutions in Thalassery

References

Christian schools in Kerala
High schools and secondary schools in Kerala
Schools in Kannur district
Education in Thalassery
Educational institutions established in 1941
1941 establishments in India